Sun Guoliang (born 6 February 1991) is a Chinese footballer currently playing as a defender for Kunshan.

Club career
Sun Guoliang would play for second tier club Hunan Billows for several seasons before he joined another second tier club Qingdao Huanghai on 4 January 2017. He would make his debut for Qingdao in a league game on 11 March 2017 against Beijing Enterprises Group in a 2-1 victory. After two seasons he moved to third tier club Kunshan on 20 February 2019 and was part of the team that gained promotion to the second tier at the end of the 2019 China League Two campaign. He would go on to establish himself as regular within the team and was part of the squad that won the division and promotion to the top tier at the end of the 2022 China League One campaign.

Career statistics
.

Honours

Club 
Kunshan
 China League One: 2022

References

External links
Sun Guoliang at Worldfootball.net

1991 births
Living people
Footballers from Qingdao
Footballers from Shandong
Chinese footballers
Association football defenders
China League One players
China League Two players
Qingdao F.C. players
Kunshan F.C. players